The  Philadelphia Eagles season was the franchise's 66th season in the National Football League (NFL). The team failed to improve on their previous output of 6–9–1, winning only three games. Head coach Ray Rhodes was fired at end of season, finishing his four-year tenure with a record of 29–34–1.

The Eagles’ 161 points-scored (10.06 per game) is tied for the third-lowest total in a 16-game schedule. Philadelphia’s three quarterbacks—Bobby Hoying, Koy Detmer, and Rodney Peete—each won one game, and threw for only seven total touchdowns combined.

Offseason

NFL draft 
The table shows the Eagles selections and what picks they had that were traded away and the team that ended up with that pick. It is possible the Eagles' pick ended up with this team via another team that the Eagles made a trade with.
Not shown are acquired picks that the Eagles traded away.

Staff

Roster

Regular season

Schedule 

Note: Intra-division opponents are in bold text.

Standings

References

External links 
 1998 Philadelphia Eagles at Pro-Football-Reference.com

Philadelphia Eagles seasons
Philadelphia Eagles
Philadelphia Eagles